Prószków (German: Proskau) is a town in Opole County, Opole Voivodeship in southern Poland. It is the administrative seat of Gmina Prószków, a Polish/German bilingual commune since 2006.

Geography
As of 2019 it has 2,570 inhabitants.

Since then, it is the highest temperature ever recorded in any city located in present-day Poland (the town was then a part of Germany).

History

Prószków in the Silesian Duchy of Opole of fragmented Poland was first mentioned in a 1250 deed. From the 14th century onwards the estates were held by the Prószkowski (also known as Pruskowski, Pruskovsky, von Proskau) noble family. In fact, the noble family's surname is after the name of the town. Count Jerzy (Jiri, George) Prószkowski had the parish church and a Renaissance castle built in the late 16th century, which both were set ablaze by Swedish troops during the Thirty Years' War and had to be rebuilt in their present Baroque style after the war.

After the First Silesian War the town became part of Prussia in 1742 under the Germanized name Proskau. From 1763 the castle housed a famous faience manufacture, founded by count Leopold Prószkowski. The faience was sold mainly throughout Prussia, Poland and Austria. After the death of Leopold Prószkowski in 1769 his estate (including the manufacture) passed to Karl Maximilian Dietrichstein, which moved its most valuable collections, including the library, treasury and archive, to another location in then Austria in 1782, and eventually sold the estate to the Prussian king Frederick the Great in 1783. Part of the collection was found in 2011 in Brno and Mikulov in the Czech Republic. From 1871 to 1945 the town was part of Germany. From 1847 the castle was used as an agronomic college, which was relocated to Berlin in 1881. The succeeding institute for pomological research, including an arboretum and extensive orchards, exists up to today.

After World War II only parts of the German population were expelled. Prószków regained a town charter in 2004, it officially adopted its German name Proskau as a second name on 30 April 2010.

The coat of arms of the town is after that of the Prószkowski family.

Transport
The Polish A4 motorway and Voivodeship roads 414 and 429 run through Prószków.

Twin towns – sister cities
See twin towns of Gmina Prószków.

References

External links

  

Cities and towns in Opole Voivodeship
Opole County
Cities in Silesia
Silesian nobility